Hugo, Prince of Radolin (1 April 1841 – 12 July 1917), born Hugo Julius Raoul Eduard Graf Leszczyc von Radolin-Radolinski, was a Polish-German aristocrat and statesman who served as an ambassador for the Kingdom of Prussia and later, the German Empire, as well as a high-ranking official in the royal and imperial courts.

Early life 
Hugo was born into the old Polish noble family of Radolin-Radoliński, the son of Count Ladislaus von Radolin-Radolinski (1808–1879), a member of the Prussian House of Lords who served as a chamberlain in the court of King Frederick William IV, and of his cousin Josephine von Radolin-Radolinski (1809-1880). He was a direct descendant of Piotr Wysz Radoliński, a member of the Leszczyc clan who was one of the witnesses to the signing of the Union of Horodło in 1413. Radolinski had also served as bishop of Kraków and Poznań, as well as royal chancellor of the court during the reign of King Władysław II Jagiełło and Queen Jadwiga.

As a child, Hugo spent much of his time between the family estates in Borzęciczki, Sierniki, and Jarocin, before moving with his mother to Dresden in 1847. He studied political science and law in Bonn, during which he met and befriended Friedrich von Holstein, the future head of the political department of the German Foreign Office. In 1860 he joined the Prussian Army as a one-year volunteer in the 7th Hussars Regiment, before being appointed as a second lieutenant in the 2nd Life-Hussars Regiment. Upon the completion of his military service, Hugo returned to his studies, and graduated from the University of Berlin in December 1862.

Diplomatic career 
After working at a district court in Pleschen from 1864 to 1866, Radolin-Radolinski officially entered the diplomatic service. He was firstly an attaché as part of the Prussian legation to Florence in 1869, before serving as a secretary at the Prussian embassy in Paris and later, chargé d'affaires in Stuttgart in that year. During the Franco-Prussian War, he worked at the high command of the occupying forces in France, as a member of the delegation from Prussia's Ministry of Foreign Affairs. Two years later, in 1874, he was dispatched by Imperial Chancellor Otto von Bismarck to Madrid as Germany's first ambassador to Spain, and in that same year he was transferred to Dresden. In 1876, he became Germany's first ambassador to the Ottoman Empire, representing Russia's interests during the Russo-Turkish War. He inherited his father's seat in the House of Lords in 1880.

Upon his return to Europe in 1881, Radolin-Radolinski worked as ambassador to Weimar before he was appointed marshal of the court to the German Crown Prince, the future Emperor Frederick III, in 1884. Bismarck initially opposed the appointment, due to Radolin-Radolinski's Polish and Catholic background, but gradually relented; it was even claimed by Franz von Roggenbach that Radolin-Radolinski was a spy for Bismarck. He became a close confidante of the chancellor, as well as the Crown Prince and his wife; similarly to the latter, he shared their favour of a foreign policy friendly to Great Britain, in opposition to Bismarck's pro-Russian policy. It was Radolin-Radolinski who, against the wishes of the Empress, informed Frederick's son Prince Wilhelm of his father's terminal illness. For his services to the imperial family Wilhelm II elevated him to the title of Prince (Fürst) of Radolin in 1888, and appointed him  chief seneschal of the court and a member of the Privy Council.

Later life 
Upon his retirement, Radolin returned to Jarocin, where he focused on expanding his estate between 1911 and 1914. On 19 June 1915, the New York Times reported that Radolin and his wife were arrested in April and charged with espionage against the Triple Entente; they later clarified that the couple were simply requested to return to their home, where they were placed under house arrest.

Prince Radolin died in 1917, and was interred in the family crypt in St. Martin's Church in Jarotschin.

Marriages and issue 
On 4 July 1863 in London, Radolin-Radolinski married firstly Lucy Catherine Wakefield (1841-1880), the daughter of British Lieutenant-colonel Hon. Alfred Howard Wakefield and Marry Suffolk. From this marriage, they had four children.

After Lucy's death from tuberculosis, Radolin married secondly in Oberglogau on 4 June 1892 to Countess Johanna von Oppersdorff (1864–1947), daughter of Count Hans von Oppersdorff (1832-1877) and Elisabeth of Talleyrand-Périgord, daughter of Alexandre de Talleyrand-Périgord, Duke of Dino and granddaughter of Princess Dorothea of Courland. The wedding was a grand affair attended by Wilhelm II himself. They had three children from this marriage.

Titles, honours and awards 
 Granted the noble title of Prince (Fürst), April 1888
 Honorary Citizen of the City of Jarotschin, 1897

Orders and decorations

Notes

References

Bibliography 
 

1841 births
1917 deaths
People from Poznań
People from the Kingdom of Prussia
19th-century Polish nobility
German princes
Members of the Prussian House of Lords
Ambassadors of Germany to France
Ambassadors of Germany to Russia
Ambassadors of Germany to Spain
Ambassadors of Germany to the Ottoman Empire
Recipients of the Iron Cross (1870), 2nd class
Grand Croix of the Légion d'honneur
Knights of the Order of Saints Maurice and Lazarus
Knights of Malta
Grand Crosses of the Order of Saint-Charles
Recipients of the Order of the Medjidie, 1st class
Recipients of the Gold Imtiyaz Medal
Recipients of the Silver Imtiyaz Medal
Grand Crosses of the Order of the Crown (Romania)
Wakefield family
20th-century Polish nobility